Terry Flanagan (born 1950) was an Irish soccer player who played for Bohemians, Dundalk and Thurles Town during the 1970s.

Flanagan was top scorer in the 1973-74 League of Ireland season with 18 league goals from 26 games. His total for that season was 29 goals from 43 appearances in all competitions. He made three appearances for Bohemians in European competition, scoring once at Ibrox in the European Cup.

In November 1975 he was transfer listed. He then signed for Dundalk F.C. and scored on his debut. In his three seasons at Oriel Park he scored a total of 33 goals including the winner in a 1977-78 European Cup Winners' Cup clash with Hajduk Split.

Honours
 League of Ireland: 2
 Bohemians 1974-75
 Dundalk F.C. 1975-76
 FAI Cup: 1
 Dundalk F.C. 1977
 League of Ireland Cup: 1
 Dundalk F.C. 1978
  Leinster Senior Cup: 2
 Bohemians 1976–77, 1977–78

References 

Republic of Ireland association footballers
Association football forwards
League of Ireland players
Bohemian F.C. players
Dundalk F.C. players
1950 births
Living people
League of Ireland XI players